Allahabad Cricketers (इलाहाबाद क्रिकेटर्स) was founded as a cricket club in 1985 at Madan Mohan Malviya Stadium in Allahabad for young cricketers. Its first coach and manager was Ramesh Pal. He appointed Alok Ranjan Singh as the club's first full-time captain.

Famous Players 
The players like Ashish Zaidi, Gyanendra Pandey, Obaid Kamal, Mohammad Saif, Mohammad Kaif, Vinod Pandey, Rambabu Pal, Jyoti Yadav have grown while playing for this club. The main practice ground for this club has been Madan Mohan Malviya Stadium in the historical Alfred Park of Allahabad.

One of its prodigies, Rambabu Pal who was in under-16 India camp along with Sachin Tendulkar and Vinod Kambli, committed suicide at the age of 34.

Allahabad has produced several cricketers for Under-19 and University of Allahabad cricket team. L.B. Kala, Ramesh Pal, Brijesh Sahay, B.N. Agrwal, Arun Singh, Ravindra Singh, Vinod Pandey, Alok Singh, Mohammad Asif and many others went on to play for the university team. Brijesh Sahay, B.N. Agrwal and Alok Singh also played regularly for famous Subhania Club in DDCA's A-Division league and other tournaments in Delhi.

Allahabad Cricketers has had several senior players from the Ranji trophy teams of Uttar Pradesh and Railways right from the beginning. Veteran players like K.B. Kala, Hyder Ali, Mohammad Tarif, Sekhar Anand, Giridhari Mishra, have guided players for many years.

Coaches 
Allahabad Cricketers has also produced coaches who were trained at National Institute of Sports (NIS) and Sports Authority of India. Following the footsteps of Ramesh Pal, others like Devesh Mishra, Arun Singh, Ravindra Singh and many more become qualified and successful coach for next generation of players in different parts of India.

MP Singh who worked as the Cricket Coach of University of Allahabad, after graduating from National Institute of Sports (NIS) contributed to talent development and coaching set-up in Allahabad. Later MP Singh moved to Delhi to assist Dronacharya awardee Gurcharan Singh at National Stadium Cricket Center. There he developed several national and international players.

References

Cricket teams in India
1985 establishments in Uttar Pradesh